"Monkey Man" is a song by English rock band the Rolling Stones, featured as the eighth track on their 1969 album Let It Bleed.

Composition and recording
Mick Jagger and Keith Richards wrote "Monkey Man" as a tribute to Italian pop artist Mario Schifano, whom they met on the set of his movie Umano Non Umano! (Human, Not Human!). Recorded in April 1969, the song's introduction features distinctive vibraphone, bass, guitar, and piano. Richards plays main riff and slide guitar solo, Jagger provides vocals, producer Jimmy Miller plays tambourine, Nicky Hopkins plays piano, Charlie Watts provides drums, while Bill Wyman plays vibraphone and bass. Wyman's vibraphone is mixed onto the left channel together with Hopkins' piano.

Personnel
 Mick Jaggervocals
 Keith Richardsguitars, backing vocals
 Bill Wymanbass guitar, vibraphone
 Charlie Wattsdrums
 Nicky Hopkinspiano
 Jimmy Millertambourine

Live performances
The Rolling Stones performed "Monkey Man" often on their 1994–1995 Voodoo Lounge Tour. A recording from their 2002/03 Licks Tour is included on Live Licks (2004).

Sampling
The distinctive piano progression in the introduction is used as the opening theme "Playing With Fire" on the Stereo MCs' 1992 album Connected.

References

The Rolling Stones songs
1969 songs
Songs about drugs
Songs written by Jagger–Richards
Song recordings produced by Jimmy Miller
British hard rock songs
Songs about primates